Jalandhar City Junction (station code: JUC) is a railway station located in Jalandhar district in the Indian state of Punjab and serves Jalandhar.

The railway station

History

The line from Jalandhar City to Mukerian was constructed in 1915. The Mukerian–Pathankot line was built in 1952, The construction of the Pathankot–Jammu Tawi line was initiated in 1965, after the Indo-Pakistani War of 1965, and opened in 1971.

The Firozpur Cantonment-Jalandhar City branch line was opened in 1912.

Electrification
The electrification of Phagwara–Jalandhar Cantt–Jalandhar City–Amritsar sector was initiated in 1997.

DMU shed
India's first and largest DMU shed at Jalandhar holds 90 units placed in service in whole Punjab. It also houses two BEML-built rail buses which operate on the Beas–Goindwal Sahib line. In 2019, it completed 50 years of service and was converted into an electric shed MEMU and allotted 2 new rakes of MEMU train including medical relief van.

Passenger movement
Jalandhar City is amongst the top hundred booking stations of Indian Railway.

Amenities
Jalandhar City railway station has computerized reservation counters, GRP (railway police) office, retiring rooms, vegetarian and non-vegetarian refreshment rooms and book stall.

References

External links
 Trains at Jalandhar City

Railway stations in Jalandhar district
Firozpur railway division
Transport in Jalandhar
1870 establishments in India